Tangyan (also Lan-ts'ang-hsien or Tangyang) is the principal town of Tangyan Township in Shan State, Myanmar. It is situated in a valley in a mountainous region. It lies at an elevation of 946 m.

References

External links
Tangyan at FallingRaing.com

Populated places in Shan State
Township capitals of Myanmar